Werneria, also known as the torrent toads or smalltongue toads, is a small genus of "true toads", family Bufonidae. They are found in western Central Africa (Equatorial Guinea, Gabon, and Cameroon), with the greatest species richness in the Western High Plateau of Cameroon.  The species generally have restricted or patchy distributions and are considered threatened.

Etymology
The genus is named after Franz Werner, Austrian zoologist and herpetologist who was active in Africa.

Description
They do not have hearing organs, vocal sacs (they are silent), nor parotoid glands. Skin is smooth. Toe webbing ranges from rudimentary to full. Tadpoles have a short, muscular tail and a flat body with a huge sucker mouth.

Species

Habitat
Werneria are associated with torrential forest streams, which also is their breeding habitat. Tadpoles use their sucker mouth to cling to the rocks. Outside the breeding season, adult toads can be found in leaf litter far away from streams. They are known from altitudes between

References

 
Amphibians of Sub-Saharan Africa
Amphibian genera